The 2012 U.S. Open Grand Prix Gold was the seventh grand prix gold and grand prix tournament of the 2012 BWF Grand Prix Gold and Grand Prix. The tournament was held in Orange County Badminton Club, Orange, United States July 2 until July 7, 2012 and had a total purse of $120,000.

Men's singles

Seeds

  Takuma Ueda (final)
  Henri Hurskainen (second round)
  Vladimir Ivanov (champion)
  Tan Chun Seang (semi-final)
  Niluka Karunaratne (quarter-final)
  Chou Tien-chen (quarter-final)
  Michael Lahnsteiner (third round)
  Chetan Anand (third round)
  Misha Zilberman (first round)
  Christian Lind Thomsen (first round)
  Ivan Sozonov (third round)
  Arvind Bhat (first round)
  Joachim Persson (third round)
  Sattawat Pongnairat (first round)
  Luka Wraber (first round)
  Edwin Ekiring (quarter-final)

Finals

Top half

Section 1

Section 2

Section 3

Section 4

Bottom half

Section 5

Section 6

Section 7

Section 8

Women's singles

Seeds

  Pai Hsiao-ma (champion)
  Neslihan Yigit (withdrew)
  Michelle Chan Ky (first round)
  Anastasia Prokopenko (quarter-final)

Finals

Top half

Section 1

Section 2

Bottom half

Section 3

Section 4

Men's doubles

Seeds

  Hiroyuki Endo / Kenichi Hayakawa (champion)
  Vladimir Ivanov / Ivan Sozonov (quarter-final)
  Tony Gunawan / Howard Bach (semi-final)
  Yoshiteru Hirobe / Kenta Kazuno (final)

Finals

Top half

Section 1

Section 2

Bottom half

Section 3

Section 4

Women's doubles

Seeds

  Misaki Matsutomo / Ayaka Takahashi (champion)
  Valeria Sorokina / Nina Vislova (final)
  Eva Lee / Paula Lynn Obanana (quarter-final)
  Nicole Grether / Charmaine Reid (second round)

Finals

Top half

Section 1

Section 2

Bottom half

Section 3

Section 4

Mixed doubles

Seeds

  Alexandr Nikolaenko / Valeria Sorokina (second round)
  Toby Ng / Grace Gao (semi-final)
  Kenichi Hayakawa / Misaki Matsutomo (final)
  Roman Zirnwald / Elisabeth Baldauf (second round)

Finals

Top half

Section 1

Section 2

Bottom half

Section 3

Section 4

References

U.S. Open Badminton Championships
U.S. Open Grand Prix Gold
BWF Grand Prix Gold and Grand Prix
U.S. Open Grand Prix